This is a discography of the Australian rock singer-songwriter and guitarist Ian Moss.

Albums

Studio albums

Live albums

Extended plays

Singles

Videos

Other appearances
Flowers – Icehouse (1980)
Richard Clapton – The Great Escape (1982)
Catfish – Ruby (1991)
The Black Sorrows – Better Times (1992)
Jimmy Barnes – Heat (1993)
Richard Clapton – Distant Thunder (1993)
Don Walker – We're all Gunna Die (1995)
Richard Clapton – Diamond Mine (2004)
Jimmy Barnes – Double Happiness (2005)
"When the War Is Over" with Jimmy Barnes - ' Music from the Home Front (2020)

See also
Cold Chisel discography

References

External links

Discographies of Australian artists
Rock music discographies
Pop music discographies